Kelp Bay is a small open bay close east-southeast of Doris Bay on the north coast of South Georgia. It is filled with kelp and there is no anchorage. The South Georgia Survey, 1951–52, reported that the descriptive name was well established locally.

References

Bays of South Georgia